Jakub Přichystal (born 25 October 1995) is a Czech football player who currently plays for Sigma Olomouc.

References

 Profile at FC Zbrojovka Brno official site
 Profile at Moravskoslezská fotbalová liga official site

1995 births
Living people
Czech footballers
Czech First League players
FC Zbrojovka Brno players
Sportspeople from Brno
SFC Opava players
SK Líšeň players
Association football forwards
FK Frýdek-Místek players
MFK Vyškov players
Czech National Football League players
SK Sigma Olomouc players